The Church of the Pater Noster is a Roman Catholic church located on the Mount of Olives in Jerusalem. It is part of a Carmelite monastery, also known as the Sanctuary of the Eleona. The Church of the Pater Noster stands right next to the ruins of the 4th-century Byzantine Church of Eleona. The ruins of the Eleona were rediscovered in the 20th century and its walls were partially rebuilt. Today, France claims ownership of the land on which both churches and the entire monastery are standing, under the Ottoman capitulations and further it claims the land as a French Domaine national which has been formalised by the Fischer-Chauvel Agreement of 1948, though the agreement has not been ratified by Israel’s Knesset.

Biblical background
The 2nd-century Acts of John mentions the existence of a cave on the Mount of Olives associated with the teachings of Jesus, but not specifically the Lord's Prayer.

History

Constantine and the Byzantine period
The modern Church of the Pater Noster is built right next to the site of a fourth-century basilica commissioned by Constantine I to commemorate the Ascension of Jesus. The latter was built under the direction of Constantine's mother Helena in the early 4th century, who named it the Church of the Disciples. The pilgrim Egeria is the oldest surviving source referring to it as the Church of the Eleona (Greek for olive grove) in the late 4th century. The church is mentioned by the Bordeaux pilgrim in the Itinerarium Burdigalense circa 333, and the historian Eusebius of Caesarea recounts that Constantine constructed a church over a cave on the Mount of Olives that had been linked with the Ascension.

The church survived intact until it was destroyed by Persians in 614.

Crusader church
The memory of Jesus' teaching remained associated with this site, and during the Crusades it became exclusively associated with the teaching of the Lord's Prayer. The Crusaders built a small oratory amid the ruins in 1106, and a full church was constructed in 1152, thanks to funds donated by the Danish Bishop Svend of Viborg, who is buried inside the church. The Crusader-era church was heavily damaged during Sultan Saladin's siege of Jerusalem in 1187, eventually being abandoned and falling into ruin by 1345.

Modern church and ruins recovered
In 1851, the remaining stones of the 4th-century church were sold for tombstones in the Valley of Jehoshaphat.

The site was acquired by Princess Aurelia Bossi de la Tour d'Auvergne (1809–1889) in the second half of the 19th century, and a search for the cave mentioned by early pilgrims began. In 1868, she built a cloister and founded a Carmelite convent in 1872. A convent church was erected in the 1870s.

In 1910, the foundations of the ancient church that once stood over the venerated cave were finally found, partly stretching beneath the modern cloister. The convent was moved nearby and reconstruction of the Byzantine church began in 1915. The reconstruction was stopped in 1927 when funds ran out, and the renewed Church of Eleona remains unfinished. The French architect , who was put in charge of rebuilding the ancient church, arrived in Jerusalem in September 1926.

The tomb which Princess Aurelia Bossi prepared for herself during her lifetime stands at the entrance of the modern church. She died in Florence in 1889, and her remains were brought to the church in 1957, according to her last wish.

Design and layout

4th-century Byzantine church
The 4th-century Byzantine church has been partially reconstructed and provides a good sense of what the original was like. The church's dimensions are the same as the original's and the garden outside the three doors outlines the atrium area. The church is unroofed and has steps that lead into a grotto where some Christians believe that Jesus revealed to his disciples his prophecy of the destruction of Jerusalem and the second coming. Unfortunately, the cave containing the grotto partially collapsed when it was discovered in 1910. It also cuts partly into a 1st-century tomb.

As one enters the south door of the Byzantine church, on the left there are fragments of the mosaic floor of the baptistery.

19th-century church
The 19th-century cloister is modelled on the Campo Santo at Pisa, Italy. It separates the partly reconstructed Byzantine church, which stands west of it, from he small 19th-century convent church, which stands east of it.

Princess Aurelia Bossi's tomb stands in the western lateral chamber of the narthex, on the right-hand side as one enters the church.

Lord's Prayer plaques
The walls of the cloister, of the convent church and the partially reconstructed Eleona church are all used to display plaques that bear the Lord's Prayer in a total of well over 100 different languages and dialects.

Location
The church is located in the At-Tur district of Jerusalem, which has a population of about 18,000 mostly Muslim Arabs, with a small Christian minority.

Gallery

References

 Jerome Murphy-O'Connor, Oxford Archaeological Guides: The Holy Land (Oxford, 1998), 125–26.
 Kay Prag, Blue Guide to Israel and the Palestinian Territories (Black and Norton, 2002), 230–31.
 Daniel Jacobs, Mini Rough Guide to Jerusalem (Rough Guides, 1999), 105–06.

External links

 Sacred Destinations
 The Pater Noster Church
Photos of the Church of the Pater Noster at the Manar al-Athar photo archive

Pater Noster
4th-century churches
4th-century establishments in the Byzantine Empire
Articles containing video clips
Church buildings in the Kingdom of Jerusalem
Byzantine church buildings in Israel
Mount of Olives
Overseas France
Constantine the Great and Christianity
Ascension of Jesus